The William Bowen Lustron House is a historic residence in Florence, Alabama.  The Lustron house was purchased by William Bowen in 1949.  The prefabricated, metal frame house is one of the company's two-bedroom Westchester Deluxe models.  The metal side-gable roof is painted brown to mimic ceramic tile.  The house is clad with blue porcelain enamel panels with white window surrounds.  The left window on the façade is a bay window that projects slightly from the house, differentiating the Deluxe model from the Standard.  The southeast corner is recessed, forming an entry porch.  The house was listed on the National Register of Historic Places in 2000.

References

National Register of Historic Places in Lauderdale County, Alabama
Houses on the National Register of Historic Places in Alabama
Houses completed in 1949
Lustron houses in Alabama
Houses in Lauderdale County, Alabama